Early parliamentary elections were held in Egypt on 7 June 1979, with a second round for 147 seats being held on 14 June. Following the experimental 1976 elections, in which three different factions of the Arab Socialist Union had competed against each other, the country had returned to multi-party politics. This was confirmed in a referendum on the formation of new parties held in April.

Two candidates were elected from each of the 176 constituencies, with a second round of voting required if one or both of the candidates failed to win over 50% of the vote in the first round, or neither of the candidates with over 50% were classed as a worker or farmer (each constituency had to have at least one farmer or worker representing it). In addition, 30 seats were reserved for women, and following the election, the President appointed a further 10 members.

Around 1,600 candidates contested the election, nearly 1,000 of which were independents. The result was a victory for President Anwar Sadat's National Democratic Party, which won 347 of the 392 seats.

Results

References

Egypt
1979 in Egypt
Election and referendum articles with incomplete results
Elections in Egypt
June 1979 events in Africa